Sedoa is an Austronesian language of Central Sulawesi, Indonesia. It belongs to the Kaili–Pamona branch of the Celebic subgroup.

References

Kaili–Pamona languages
Languages of Sulawesi